Farrukhabad is a constituency of the Uttar Pradesh Legislative Assembly covering the city of Farrukhabad in the Farrukhabad district of Uttar Pradesh, India.

Farrukhabad is one of five assembly constituencies in the Farrukhabad Lok Sabha constituency. Since 2008, this assembly constituency is numbered 194 amongst 403 constituencies.

Election results

2022 

 
 

 

-->

2017
Bharatiya Janta Party candidate Major Sunil Dutt Dwivedi won in 2017 Uttar Pradesh Legislative Elections defeating Bahujan Samaj Party candidate Mohd Umar Khan by a margin of 45,427 votes.

References

External links
 

Assembly constituencies of Uttar Pradesh
Farrukhabad